Ouyang Lijian, courtesy name Gengtang was a Chinese admiral of the Zhejiang Fleet that served Zeng Guofan and Li Hongzhang who was most notable for his participation at the Battle of Zhenhai during the Sino-French War.

Biography
Ouyang was born in 1825 at Qiyang to a poor family and made his early living as a merchant selling tofu and vegetables until applying for Zeng Goufan's recruitment to train sailors while visiting Hengyang.

In 1854, he joined the Changsha Naval Division and moved to Jiangxi and Anhui. In 1863, he followed Li Hongzhang to besiege the Taiping Heavenly Army in Changzhou, and Chen Kunshu, the guardian of the Taiping Heavenly Kingdom, was arrested, and the general army of Huaiyang was nearly terminated. Ouyang also served in the Nian Rebellion and due to his participation, was awarded the Yellow Jacket, and his professional name was Qichebo Batulu. In 1880, he was transferred as Fushan Town's general soldier.In 1881, he was promoted to the Admiral of Zhejiang.During the Sino-French War, he defeated Amédée Courbet at the Battle of Zhenhai. In 1895, he was ordered to assist Liu Kun in Fengtian City due to the First Sino-Japanese War, but died on the way at the age of seventy-one.

References

Bibliography

1825 births
1895 deaths
People from Qiyang County
People of the Taiping Rebellion
Nian Rebellion
People of the Sino-French War
Xiang Army personnel
Huai Army personnel